Youngs Corner is an unincorporated community in Brookville Township, Franklin County, Indiana, United States.

The Yung brothers operated a distillery in Brookville Township until about 1905.

Geography

References

Unincorporated communities in Franklin County, Indiana
Unincorporated communities in Indiana